The Agram Trial or Zagreb Trial (known as the "High treason trial" in Serbo-Croatian, veleizdajnički proces) was the trial of 53 Serbs  in Austria-Hungary, who were accused of conspiracy to overthrow the state and place Croatia-Slavonia under Serbian rule. The Austro-Hungarian government had discredited the Croat-Serb Coalition and created an internal discussion accusing Serbs of massive conspiracy. The Pure Party of Rights, led by Josip Frank, participated in attacks on the accused Serbs (most supporters of the Serb Independent Party) and also the Croat-Serb Coalition, with government directives. Arrests were made during the Bosnian crisis, made to justify the annexation of Bosnia and Herzegovina. Some of the accused were held under bad circumstances, until the trial began in March 1909. The trial caused sensation across Europe, and was viewed as a blatant attempt to crush Serb minority politics in Croatia-Slavonia. Austria-Hungary pursued Trialism, which clashed with the popular Yugoslavism. Minister János Forgách forged documents against the accused Serbs. 31 were convicted and given 184 years in October 1909. The obvious bias and unreliable evidence led to the defendants' later release after appeal.

The accused Serbs 

 Svetozar Pribićević
 Adam Pribićević
 Valerijan Pribićević
 Lazar Bačić
 Stevan Kalember
 Rade Malobabić
 Dr. Srđan Budisavljević - Elected member of Serb-Croat Coalition
 Joco Oreščanin
 Sima A. Živković 
 Pero Bekić

See also
Friedjung Trial, Heinrich Friedjung accused Croatian leader Frano Supilo of working with Serbia

References

Sources

 
 
 
 

1909 in Austria-Hungary
1909 in Croatia
Treason trials
Political scandals
1909 in politics
History of the Serbs of Croatia
Persecution of Serbs
Austria-Hungary–Serbia relations
Yugoslavism
Austro-Hungarian Serbs
1900s in Zagreb
Austro-Hungarian rebels
Kingdom of Croatia-Slavonia